Charles McDowell Lee (February 12, 1925 – April 17, 2014) was an American politician.

Born in Clayton, Alabama, Lee went to Auburn University. He then served in the United States Navy from 1943 to 1945 during World War II. He received his bachelor's degree from Troy University and worked as a Federal Bureau of Investigation agent. In 1948, Lee was elected Mayor of Clio, Alabama. From 1954 to 1962, Lee served in the Alabama House of Representatives as a Democrat. He then worked for Governor of Alabama George Wallace. Then, from 1963 until 2011, Lee served as Secretary of the Alabama State Senate. The Lieutenant Governor of Alabama Charles S. McDowell was his uncle. He died of cancer at his home in Auburn, Alabama.

Notes

1925 births
2014 deaths
United States Navy personnel of World War II
People from Auburn, Alabama
People from Clayton, Alabama
Auburn University alumni
Troy University alumni
Federal Bureau of Investigation agents
Mayors of places in Alabama
Democratic Party members of the Alabama House of Representatives
Deaths from cancer in Alabama
People from Clio, Alabama